Physoceras is a genus of flowering plants from the orchid family, Orchidaceae. It is native to Madagascar and Réunion; it was also formerly present in Mauritius but now apparently extinct there.

Physoceras australe Boiteau - Madagascar
Physoceras bellum Schltr. - Madagascar
Physoceras betsomangense Bosser - Madagascar
Physoceras bifurcum H.Perrier - Madagascar
Physoceras boryanum (A.Rich.) Bosser - Mauritius†, Réunion
Physoceras castillonii P.Bernet - Réunion
Physoceras epiphyticum Schltr. - Madagascar
Physoceras lageniferum H.Perrier - Madagascar
Physoceras mesophyllum (Schltr.) Schltr. - Madagascar
Physoceras perrieri Schltr. - Madagascar
Physoceras rotundifolium H.Perrier - Madagascar
Physoceras violaceum Schltr. - Madagascar

See also 
 List of Orchidaceae genera

References 

 Berg Pana, H. 2005. Handbuch der Orchideen-Namen. Dictionary of Orchid Names. Dizionario dei nomi delle orchidee. Ulmer, Stuttgart

External links 

Orchideae genera
Orchideae